The Insurance Regulatory Information System (IRIS) is a database of insurance companies in the United States run by the National Association of Insurance Commissioners.  IRIS is designed to provide information about insurers' financial solvency.

Rating method
IRIS uses the financial statements of the insurer to calculate a series of financial ratios, which are then taken as a measure of the insurer's overall financial condition.  If the ratios do not fit into a predetermined range, then IRIS may identify the company for regulation by appropriate authorities.

The system acts as an early-warning protection, which aids state insurance departments to pick out those companies that show financial problems.  The ratios are merely guidelines, though: often a financial disaster comes without warning, or defies prediction.

References

Insurance in the United States